Valeriy Pavlovych Pustovoitenko (born 23 February 1947) is a Ukrainian politician who served as prime minister of Ukraine from 1997 to 1999. He resigned in connection with Leonid Kuchma's re-election for a new term. He is a former leader of the People's Democratic Party of Ukraine.

References

1947 births
Living people
People from Mykolaiv Oblast
Mayors of Dnipro
People's Democratic Party (Ukraine) politicians
Prime Ministers of Ukraine
First convocation members of the Verkhovna Rada
Fourth convocation members of the Verkhovna Rada
Transport ministers of Ukraine
Cabinet Office ministers of Ukraine
Football Federation of Ukraine chairmen
Recipients of the Order of Prince Yaroslav the Wise, 3rd class
Recipients of the Order of Prince Yaroslav the Wise, 4th class
Recipients of the Honorary Diploma of the Cabinet of Ministers of Ukraine